Tho (Thổ) is the Vietnamese name for:

 Cuoi language (Austro-Asiatic)
 Tai Tho language
 Zuojiang Zhuang language